Wario Land 4 is a 2001 platform game developed by Nintendo and released for the Game Boy Advance. Wario has to gather four treasures to unlock a pyramid and save Princess Shokora from the Golden Diva.

Gameplay 

The gameplay of Wario Land 4 (which is generally similar to that of Wario Land II and Wario Land 3) allows for some open-endedness as well as some order of difficulty. After an Entry Passage that serves as a tutorial for the game, there are four main passages: the Emerald, Topaz, Ruby, and Sapphire Passages, in order of difficulty. The Emerald Passage is themed around nature. The Topaz Passage is themed around toys, games, and other "playtime" ideas. The Ruby Passage is themed around mechanics and technology. The Sapphire Passage is themed around horror and danger, prominently involving ghosts and the like. After these four main passages is the "Final" Golden Pyramid, which serves as a recap of these four themes and houses the Golden Passage level and the final boss.

Unlike previous entries, Wario now has a health meter that depletes when he takes damage. If Wario loses all health, he is kicked out of the stage, losing any items he had collected, and must start over.

Plot 
Wario is reading the newspaper when he notices an article about a mysterious pyramid found deep in the jungle. The legend related to the pyramid is that of Princess Shokora, ruler of the pyramid, who was cursed by the money-crazed Golden Diva. As he enters it, he finds a black cat and chases it. Doing so, he falls down a precipice and is stuck inside the pyramid.

Exploring the pyramid, Wario has to fight several bosses, each of whom is in possession of items Princess Shokora once wore. After completing these passages, Wario gains access to the innermost part of the pyramid, which ends up being the stronghold of the Golden Diva. Wario meets the cat again, who turns out to be Princess Shokora herself. Wario defeats the Golden Diva and exits the pyramid with all the treasure he has acquired. 

Upon their escape, Shokora is restored to her true form - this can range from a brattish child, a female version of Wario, a Peach-like princess and ultimately, a superheroine-like princess (what form Shokora is restored to depends on the total number of treasure chests Wario had acquired from the other bosses prior as well as how quickly the Golden Diva is defeated - if he took too long to defeat any of them, some of these chests will be withheld). Shokora gives Wario a kiss on the cheek and ascends to the afterlife as Wario watches. After she leaves, Wario grabs his loot and celebrates by going to an all-you-can-eat steak buffet.

Re-releases 
The game is included in the list of Game Boy Advance games that are available for download by Nintendo 3DS Ambassadors since December 16, 2011.

The game has been released on the Wii U Virtual Console in Japan on April 30, 2014, in North America on May 8, 2014, and in Europe and Australia on June 5, 2014.

Reception 

In the United States, Wario Land 4 sold 720,000 copies and earned $20 million by August 2006. During the period between January 2000 and August 2006, it was the 33rd highest-selling game launched for the Game Boy Advance, Nintendo DS or PlayStation Portable in that country. The game ended up selling 2.2 million copies worldwide.

The game received critical acclaim. IGN gave Wario Land 4 a 9 out of 10, or "Outstanding", citing its well thought out level design and replayability. GamePro stated "Boasting fantastic graphics and awesome transparency effects for water and fog, Wario Land 4 pushes the GBA to its visual limits". GameSpot commented "The gameplay is tight and varied, the graphics are detailed and bright, and the sound is second to none". GameSpy called the game: "An incredibly entertaining, diverse, and humorous addition to the Mario/Wario legacy. It's challenging and creative, but not as outright frustrating as Wario Land 3." Game Informer noted "It's nothing new to the Wario Land enthusiast, but it's enjoyable nonetheless". Nintendo Power stated "It's polished variety paired with a mishmash of moves, which makes Wario Land 4 fun through and through".

Wario Land 4 was a runner-up for GameSpots annual "Best Game Boy Advance Game" and, among console games, "Best Platform Game" awards. These went respectively to Advance Wars and Conker's Bad Fur Day.

Notes

References

External links 
 Official website (in Japanese)

2001 video games
Cancelled Game Boy Color games
Game Boy Advance games
Nintendo Research & Development 1 games
Single-player video games
Video game sequels
Video games developed in Japan
Video games with alternate endings
Virtual Console games for Wii U
Virtual Console games
Wario Land
Virtual Console games for Nintendo 3DS